The quadricycle is a European Union vehicle category for four-wheeled microcars, which allows these vehicles to be designed to less stringent requirements when compared to regular cars. Quadricycles are defined by limitations in terms of weight, engine power and speed.

There are two categories of quadricycles: light quadricycles (L6e) and heavy quadricycles (L7e).

History
The quadricycle classification was officially created in 1992, when the European Union published Directive 92/61/EEC which decreed that quadricycles fell into the same category as mopeds. In 2002, Framework Directive 2002/24/EC then refined this definition by distinguishing between light and heavy quadricycles (L6e and L7e categories).

The framework for drivers licences of light quadricycles in the EU was released in 2006, with Directive 2006/126 (the third Driving Licence directive). This directive applies the same requirements for light quadricycles as for mopeds. This directive includes a recommendation to specify a minimum driving age of 16 years, although the age limit actually varies between 14 and 18 years between countries.

Categories

Light quadricycles (L6e)

Light quadricycles (L6e) are defined by Framework Directive 2002/24/EC as: "motor vehicles with four wheels  whose unladen mass is not more than 425 kg, not including the mass of the batteries in case of electric vehicles, whose maximum design speed is not more than 45 km/h, and:
 whose engine cylinder capacity does not exceed 50 cm3 for spark (positive) ignition engines, or
 whose maximum net power output does not exceed 6 kW in the case of other (e.g. diesel fuelled) internal combustion engines, or
 whose maximum continuous rated power does not exceed 6 kW in the case of an electric motor.

These vehicles shall fulfill the technical requirements applicable to three-wheel mopeds of category L2e unless specified differently in any of the separate directives".

Heavy quadricycles (L7e)

Quadricycles (L7e), also referred to as Heavy quadricycles, are defined by Framework Directive 2002/24/EC as motor vehicles with four wheels "other than those referred to (as light quadricycles), whose unladen mass is not more than 450 kg (category L7e) (600 kg for vehicles intended for carrying goods), not including the mass of batteries in the case of electric vehicles, with a design payload not more than 200 kg (passenger) or 1000 kg (goods), and whose maximum net engine power does not exceed 15 kW. These vehicles shall be considered to be motor tricycles and shall fulfil the technical requirements applicable to motor tricycles of category L5e unless specified differently in any of the separate Directives".

Country-specific legislation

Finland 
The age limit for quadricycles is 15, while it is 18 years for cars in general. Mopeds have been traditionally popular in Finland among youth, and quadricycles have been introduced into the same niche. There is a licence category called AM-121, introduced in 2013, separately for quadricycles, although M-class (moped) licenses issued before 2013 qualify as well. Higher categories of licences (A1, A and B) automatically qualify for quadricycles, but age limits of A1, A and B are 16, 18 and 18, respectively.

Some have been concerned about the danger that quadricycles' low speed poses to other traffic.

France 
In France, small cars which are classified as Voiture Sans Permis (vehicle without licence) can be driven without a driving licence.

Certain quadricycles can be driven on a "road safety certificate" category of drivers licence, which is available to people 14 years or older.

United Kingdom 
Since 2000 these small cars have been split in two different classifications, light and heavy quadricycles.

A Light quadricycle, a micro car with less than 6kw of power, and an unladen mass no more than 425 kg can be driven on a full bike licence. Anything more powerful or  more heavy requires a full car licence to be legally driven as a vehicle on UK roads.

Manufacturers 
 Aixam
 Casalini
 Chatenet
 Grecav
 Italcar
 Jonway
 Ligier
 Melex
 Piaggio
 Renault

See also 
 Car classification
 Vehicle category

References

Quadricycle
 Quadricycle
Quadricycles